Stuart Williams Douglass (born March 31, 1990) is an American-Israeli professional basketball player for Maccabi Ashdod of the Israeli Premier League. He played college basketball at the University of Michigan. Douglass is known as a three-point specialist.

He was born in Indianapolis, Indiana, and is Jewish.

College career
Douglass played at Carmel High School before going to the University of Michigan where he was a co-captain with Zack Novak in his junior and senior season. Douglass played in 136 consecutive games while at Michigan, setting the record for the most games played by a Michigan basketball player. During his career at Michigan, Douglass averaged 28.7 minutes per game and 6.9 points per game while shooting 38% from the field and 34% from three-point range. During his senior season for the 2011–12 Michigan Wolverines, the team earned a share of the 2011–12 Big Ten Conference season regular season championship.

International career
Douglass was part of Team USA as it won a gold medal in men's basketball team at the 2013 Maccabiah Games in Israel.

Professional career

Navarra (2012–2013)
On June 29, 2012, Douglass started his professional career with the Spanish team Basket Navarra Club of the LEB Oro. On February 8, 2013, Douglass recorded a career-high 22 points, shooting 7-of-10 from the field, along with three rebounds in a 71–67 win over Cáceres Ciudad del Baloncesto.

Hapoel Gilboa Galil (2013–2014)
On June 12, 2013, Douglass signed a two-year deal with Israeli team Hapoel Gilboa Galil. On November 24, 2013, Douglass recorded a season-high 18 points, shooting 8-of-13 from the field, along with six assists and two steals in a 63–73 loss to Barak Netanya. Douglass helped Gilboa Galil reach the 2014 Israeli League Quarterfinals, as well as reaching the 2014 Balkan League Finals, where they eventually lost to Levski Sofia.

Hapoel Afula (2014–2015)
On September 22, 2014, Douglass signed with Hapoel Afula of the Liga Leumit. In 29 games played for Afula, he averaged 14.3 points, 2.9 rebounds and 3.3 assists, shooting 38 percent from 3-point range.

Maccabi Kiryat Gat (2015–2016)
On July 6, 2015, Douglass signed a one-year deal with Maccabi Kiryat Gat. In 33 games played during the 2015–16 season, he averaged 7.5 points, 1.9 rebounds and 1.4 assists, shooting 39 percent from 3-point range.

Ironi Nahariya (2016–2018)
On June 25, 2016, Douglass signed with Ironi Nahariya for the 2016–17 season. On May 11, 2017, Douglass recorded a season-high 17 points, shooting 5-of-8 from three-point range, along with 3 assists and two steals in an 87–99 loss to Bnei Herzliya. Douglass helped Nahariya reach the 2017 FIBA Europe Cup Quarterfinals, as well as reaching the 2017 Israeli League Quarterfinals, where they eventually lost to Hapoel Jerusalem 2–3 in a playoff series.

On July 25, 2017, Douglass signed a one-year contract extension with Nahariya.

Hapoel Tel Aviv (2018–2019)
On August 2, 2018, Douglass signed with Hapoel Tel Aviv for the 2018–19 season. On May 27, 2019, Douglass recorded a season-high 16 points, shooting 4-of-5 from three-point range in a 72–85 playoff loss to Maccabi Tel Aviv.

Maccabi Ashdod (2019–present)
On July 27, 2019, Douglass signed a one-year deal with Maccabi Ashdod.

The Basketball Tournament
In June 2018, Douglass joined the Big X, a team composed of former Big 10 players, in The Basketball Tournament 2018.

Career statistics

College

|-
| style="text-align:left;"| 2008–09
| style="text-align:left;"| Michigan
| 35 || 23 || 22.7 || .368 || .335 || .679 || 1.4 || 2.1 || .7 || .1 || 6.0
|-
| style="text-align:left;"| 2009–10
| style="text-align:left;"| Michigan
| 32 || 23 || 31.4 || .333 || .329 || .778 || 2.1 || 2.4 || 1.0 || .0 || 6.7
|-
| style="text-align:left;"| 2010–11
| style="text-align:left;"| Michigan
| 35 || 12 || 30.4 || .408 || .358 || .231 || 2.9 || 1.6 || .6 || .2 || 7.1
|-
| style="text-align:left;"| 2011–12
| style="text-align:left;"| Michigan
| 34 || 18 || 30.4 || .406 || .338 || .839 || 2.5 || 2.2 || .7 || .1 || 7.5
|- class="sortbottom"
| colspan=2 style="text-align:center;"| Career
| 136 || 76 || 28.7 || .380 || .340 || .697 || 2.2 || 2.1 || .8 || .1 || 6.8

Source: RealGM

See also
List of select Jewish basketball players

References

External links
Profile on the University of Michigan's official athletic site
Profile on RealGM
Profile on ESPN
Profile on the Spanish Basketball Federation's site

1990 births
Living people
American expatriate basketball people in Israel
American expatriate basketball people in Spain
American men's basketball players
Basket Navarra Club players
Basketball players from Indianapolis
Carmel High School (Indiana) alumni
Hapoel Afula players
Hapoel Gilboa Galil Elyon players
Hapoel Tel Aviv B.C. players
Ironi Nahariya players
Israeli American
Israeli men's basketball players
Maccabi Ashdod B.C. players
Maccabi Kiryat Gat B.C. players
Michigan Wolverines men's basketball players
People from Carmel, Indiana
Shooting guards
Jewish men's basketball players
Competitors at the 2013 Maccabiah Games
Maccabiah Games medalists in basketball
Maccabiah Games gold medalists for the United States
21st-century American Jews